Cadbury Roses are a   selection of machine wrapped chocolates made by Cadbury. Introduced in the UK in 1938 (as a competitor to Quality Street launched by Mackintosh's in 1936), they were thought to be named after the English packaging equipment company "Rose Brothers" based in Gainsborough, Lincolnshire, that manufactured and supplied the machines that wrapped the chocolates.

By 2020, an alternative origin of the name was given in a text panel printed on the side of tubs of Roses. It notes they were named after the favourite flowers of Dorothy Cadbury, a director of the company and renowned botanist, which grew in the gardens of the original factory at Bournville. Upon launch in Ireland they were called 'Cadbury's Irish Rose'; however, this name was discontinued in the 1970s.

They are an extremely common gift on Mothering Sunday and sell well throughout the Christmas period. They are available in plastic tubs or boxes and in the UK, Isle of Man and Ireland currently contain 9 different varieties of chocolate. In a YouGov poll Cadbury Roses were ranked the 6th most famous confectionery in the UK.

Current varieties

UK and Ireland
 Golden Barrel - Milk chocolate in the shape of half a barrel, filled with caramel (gold wrapper). Previously named Caramel Keg.
 Caramel - Cadbury Caramel Toffee piece. Soft toffee encased in Cadbury Dairy Milk Chocolate (blue wrapper).
 Country Fudge - Rectangular fudge piece, coated in milk chocolate (light brown wrapper).
 Hazel in Caramel - Crescent-shaped milk chocolate with hazelnut plant engraving on top, filled with caramel and a hazelnut (purple wrapper). A recent market poll showed that this was the most popular variety in Ireland, by a margin of two-to-one over the next, the Golden Barrel (Caramel Keg).
 Hazel Whirl - Dome-shaped milk chocolate, patterned with spiral twirl, with hazelnut in centre (purple wrapper with orange edges).
 Strawberry Dream - Square-shaped milk chocolate with strawberry seed engravings on top, filled with strawberry-flavoured cream fondant (pink wrapper). The same poll which determined that the 'Hazel in Caramel' variety was most popular in Ireland also showed this as being rated the 'worst' variety.
 Tangy Orange Creme - Square-shaped milk chocolate with orange moulded on top, filled with orange-flavoured creme fondant (orange wrapper).
 Signature Truffle - New for Christmas 2013, this is a truffle encased in milk chocolate (red wrapper with blue edges).

Australia
 Classic Milk - Purple and silver.
 Peppermint Créme Crunch - Green with silver.
 Hazelnut Swirl - Pink with silver.
 Classic Caramel - Light blue with silver.
 Caramel Deluxe - Orange with brown.
 Hazelnut Créme Crisp - Orange with Silver.
 Vanilla Nougat - Cream with brown.
 White Raspberry - Silver with pink.
 Turkish Delight - Yellow with Red.
 Dark Mocha Nougat - Brown with silver.

New Zealand
 Chocolate Bliss - Purple and silver.
 Hazelnut Praline Crisp - Orange and silver.
 Strawberry Creme - Red and silver.
 Classic Fudge - Silver and light blue.
 Salted Caramel - Turquoise and silver.
 Caramel Deluxe - Bronze and black.
 Dark Mocha - Brown and silver.
 Hazelnut Whirl - Pink and silver.
 Turkish Delight - Yellow and red.
 Peppermint Creme - Green and silver.

Marketing
Cadbury Roses are most frequently advertised with the classic slogan of "Say 'Thank You', with Cadbury Roses" in the UK, New Zealand and Australia, and "Thank you very much" on television advertisements. A memorable 1960s UK advertising campaign used the slogan 'Roses Grow On You' and included television advertisements presented by the comedian Norman Vaughan.

Discontinued varieties

UK, Isle of Man & Republic of Ireland
 Brazilian Darkness - A chewy toffee square coated in dark chocolate (red wrapper with gold edges).
 Praline Moment  - Silver foil wrapped.
 Chunky Truffle - Shaped like a chocolate brick, wrapped in blue foil.
 Bournville - Small bar of Bournville Dark Chocolate.  Moved brand to Cadbury Heroes.
 Almond Charm - Blue foil-wrapped milk chocolate, with almond nut pieces.
 Coffee Creme - Coffee flavoured, fondant cream soft centre, covered in dark chocolate.
 Montelimar - Chewy nougat, encased in milk chocolate; green foil-twist wrapper.
 Marzipan - Piece of marzipan, encased in dark chocolate, Red foil-twist wrapper.
 Turkish Delight - Rectangular shaped, dark purple foil wrapped.
 Nutty Truffle Log - Log shaped; emerald green foil-twist wrapper
 Orange Crisp - Orange wrapper.
 Chocolate Bite - Pink wrapper.
 Noisette Whirl - Green and transparent wrapper.
 Lime Barrel - Green wrapper.
 Black Cherry Cream - pink/purple wrapper.
 Cadbury Dairy Milk - One rectangular chunk of Cadbury Dairy Milk chocolate divided into two squares (classic purple plastic-foil twist-wrapper, bearing 'Cadbury Dairy Milk' and the traditional 'glass and a half' logo). Moved brand to Cadbury Heroes. For many years this was the only chocolate in the selection where the wrapper did not bear the 'Cadbury Roses' logo - all others did. In 2020 this returned to the UK version, as a large chunk, wrapped in standard "dairy milk" wrapping.
 Caramel Velvet - Green wrapper.
 Almond Caramel Bite - Soft and chewy caramel, with many small pieces of almond (light brown wrapper with purple twists).

Australia
  Rose Caramel - 
 Raspberry Sundae - Silver with dark blue foil-twist wrapper, in a barrel shape.
 Fruity Fudge - Silver and green foil-twist wrapper.
 Royal Fudge - Orange foil-twist wrapper.
 Nut Caramel - Blue foil-twist wrapper.
 Vanilla Caramel - Brown foil-twist wrapper.
 Hazelnut Caramello
 Pineapple Creme - Yellow foil-twist wrapper (only around for a short time).
 Chocolate Supreme - Chocolate mousse encased in milk chocolate (purple with orange).
 Orange Chocolate Delight - Orange flavoured chocolate truffle encased in dark chocolate (brown with orange).
 Cherry Heaven - A blend of cherries and coconut covered in dark chocolate (silver with red).
 Vanilla Butter Caramel - A vanilla flavoured caramel coated in milk chocolate (silver with orange).
 Chocolate Bliss - Swirl of milk chocolate (purple with silver).
 Classic Fudge - Soft vanilla fudge surrounded in milk chocolate (silver with blue).
 Hazelnut Whirl - A roasted hazelnut embedded in milk chocolate (pink with silver).
 Salted Caramel - A chewy salted caramel covered in milk chocolate (blue with silver).
 Peppermint Créme - A peppermint créme covered in dark chocolate (green with silver).
 Caramel Deluxe - Smooth caramel covered in milk chocolate (orange with black).
 Dark Mocha - Rich espresso flavoured fudge topped with dark chocolate (brown with silver).
 Strawberry Créme - A creamy strawberry flavoured centre covered in Old Gold dark chocolate (red with silver).
 Hazelnut Praline Crisp - Roasted hazelnut pieces with a praline smothered in milk chocolate (orange with silver).

Other products

Cadbury Roses Pots Of Joy Strawberry Dream: dark chocolate dessert made with Cadbury chocolate with a strawberry coulis layer, launched 2014.
Cadbury Roses Pots Of Joy Hazelnut Whirl: dark chocolate dessert made with Cadbury chocolate with a hazelnut caramel yoghurt layer, launched 2014.
Cadbury Roses Favourites Strawberry Dream: a limited -dition bag of Strawberry Dream chocolates, launched in September 2014.
Cadbury Roses Favourites Golden Barrel: a limited-edition bag of Golden Barrel chocolates, launched in September 2014.

See also 
 Celebrations (confectionery)
 Heroes (confectionery)
 Nestlé Quality Street

References

External links 
 Cadbury Roses  Cadbury.co.uk
 History of Rose Brothers

British confectionery
Roses
Products introduced in 1938
Mondelez International brands